Burnettown is a town in Aiken County, South Carolina, United States. The population was 2,673 at the 2010 census. It is part of the Augusta, Georgia metropolitan area. Burnettown is located in historic Horse Creek Valley.

Geography
Burnettown is located at  (33.512272, -81.870520) in western Aiken County. It is bordered by the census-designated place (CDP) of Clearwater to the west, by an outer portion of the city of North Augusta to the northwest, by the CDPs of Gloverville and Langley to the east, and by the unincorporated community of Bath to the south.

Demographics

2000 census
As of the census of 2000, there were 2,720 people, 1,066 households, and 770 families residing in the town. The racial makeup of the town was 86.40% White, 11.88% African American, 0.26% Native American, 0.59% Asian, 0.26% from other races, and 0.62% from two or more races. Hispanic or Latino of any race were 0.74% of the population.

There were 1,066 households, out of which 31.3% had children under the age of 18 living with them, 57.0% were married couples living together, 10.6% had a female householder with no husband present, and 27.7% were non-families. 25.2% of all households were made up of individuals, and 11.2% had someone living alone who was 65 years of age or older. The average household size was 2.52 and the average family size was 3.00.

In the town, the population was spread out, with 24.4% under the age of 18, 8.6% from 18 to 24, 28.0% from 25 to 44, 26.0% from 45 to 64, and 13.0% who were 65 years of age or older. The median age was 38 years. For every 100 females, there were 102.4 males. For every 100 females age 18 and over, there were 94.1 males.

The median income for a household in the town was $33,140, and the median income for a family was $38,017. Males had a median income of $29,063 versus $22,364 for females. The per capita income for the town was $15,887. About 5.0% of families and 8.4% of the population were below the poverty line, including 8.2% of those under age 18 and 13.7% of those age 65 or over.

2010 census
As of the 2010 census, the total population was 2,673, of whom 0.64% were American Indian or Alaska native, 0.75% were Asian, 14.22% were African American, 78.34% were white, 4.00% were some other race, and 2.06% were two or more races. 6.40% of the population were Hispanic or Latino of any race. The population was 50.17% male and 49.83% female.

The age distribution of the population was 6.17% under 5 years of age, 16.91% age 5 to 17, 60.68% age 18 to 64, and 16.24% age 65 and over.

2020 census

As of the 2020 United States census, there were 3,105 people, 1,080 households, and 734 families residing in the town.

References

External links
 Town of Burnettown official website

Towns in Aiken County, South Carolina
Towns in South Carolina
Augusta metropolitan area